Sindara is a town in Gabon.

Notable residents
 André Raponda Walker, the anthropologist and priest worked here.
 Bruno Ben Moubamba, a Gabonese politician.

References

Populated places in Ngounié Province